Clubul Sportiv Corvinul 1921 Hunedoara, commonly known as Corvinul Hunedoara or simply as Corvinul, is a Romanian football club based in Hunedoara, Hunedoara County, currently playing in the Liga III. Founded in 1921 under the name of Fero Sport Hunedoara, the club had over time various names such as UF Hunedoara, Iancu Corvin Hunedoara, ISS Hunedoara, IMS Hunedoara, Metalul Hunedoara, Siderurgistul Hunedoara or Corvinul Hunedoara. Most of the names were related with the local Iron Plant, the main engine of the local economy and the most important sponsor of the club, until the early 2000s, but the name that had stuck with the club was Corvinul, name inspired by the Corvin Castle and the local history of the Corvins.

Under the name of Corvinul, the club achieved its best performances, during the 1980s, period when it was a constant appearance in the top-flight of the Romanian football. The creator of that team was Mircea Lucescu and the squad was formed of important players, among them: Radu Nunweiller, Florea Dumitrache, Romulus Gabor, Ioan Andone, Mircea Rednic, Michael Klein, Florea Văetuș or Ioan Petcu. In this period, the team based in Hunedoara qualified in the UEFA Cup, where it faced teams such as Grazer AK or FK Sarajevo.

The fall of communism in Romania has meant the end of the glory period for iron and mining industries, two of the engines of the 1970s and 1980s national economy. Hunedoara County was one of the most affected regions due to its economy, which was based exactly on these two sectors of activity, thus the downfall of the economy affected directly Corvinul, which relegated to the Liga II in 1992 and never promoted back. The club was gradually drained of financial power and was expelled by the Romanian Football Federation in 2004. Between 2005 and 2021, Corvinul was succeeded by Corvinul 2005, then FC Hunedoara and CS Hunedoara, but none of this entities was recognized as the official successor, due to legal processes and the loss of the original brand. "FC Corvinul 1921" brand was recovered in 2021 by the Municipality of Hunedoara, on the occasion of Corvinul's Centenary, when the local administration bought it for 47,000€ from Octavian Marian, the last owner. In the summer of 2022, the last active entity, CS Hunedoara, merged with the original brand (FC Corvinul 1921), becoming the successor of the original football club and reuniting the history of Corvinul from 2005 to the present.

History

The Pride of the Iron Workers (1921–1953)

Football has been practiced in Hunedoara, in an unorganized way, since the early 1900s, being brought by young locals which were studying in the big cities of the country or abroad, as happened with most of the football beginnings in Transylvania.

The year 1921 will be the first one in which a Football Championship was organized between the borders of the Kingdom of Romania, a championship which was running as a tournament with regional leagues and a national final stage. In the same year, in Hunedoara, on the initiative of several sports enthusiasts, led by Ludovic Rimbaș was established the first organized football team, Fero Sport Hunedoara. The new football club operated under the patronage of the local Iron Plant. Iosif Onciu (then director of the Iron Plant) was elected president, and Ludovic Rimbaș held both the position of secretary of the club and the manager of the team. The company's headquarters were in the former premises of the "Red Union" in Severin Street.

Hunedoara's first organized football team aroused great enthusiasm among the locals, but especially among the employees of the Iron Plant, who agreed to each contribute 1% of their salary to support the new football team. At the same time, the footballers were regularly awarded by the management of the Plant and had priority in employment. Thus, from the very beginning, the football team had a close connection with the local Iron Plant, which later became a Steel Plant.

From 1924, the team changed its name to U.F.H (Uzinele de Fier Hunedoara) and in 1936, to Iancu Corvin Hunedoara. During the World War II the situation was very difficult, the team played on various makeshift grounds, more or less arranged. The club's financial situation was particularly difficult, but the club survived. In 1943, the team's name returned to U.F.H. (Uzinele de Fier Hunedoara). With the reorganization of Romania under the communist regime, the team took over the new name of the old Iron Plant, I.S.S. Hunedoara (Întreprinderile Siderurgice de Stat Hunedoara). In the same year, the football team played in the third tier (Divzia C) under the name I.M.S. Hunedoara (Întreprinderea Muncitorească Siderurgică Hunedoara) and a year later, the club's management was taken over by the union within the steel unit, the name changed again and became Metalul Hunedoara.

In 1953, Metalul was promoted to the top-flight (Divizia A) for the first time, a moment that remained in history as the first time when a football club based in the “Steel City” crossed the threshold of the first tier. In that season, Hunedoara finished on the first place in the 2nd Series, 4 points away from the runners-up, another team financially supported by the Steel Industry of Romania, Metalul Câmpia Turzii.

A Period of Struggles (1954–1975)
Metalul fought proudly in its first top-flight season (1954), but finally relegated after it was ranked 11th of 14, first team placed under the relegation line. The 1950s continued with five consecutive appearances in the Second Division: (1955 – 6th, 1956 – 2nd, 1957–58 – 2nd, 1958–59 – 4th and 1959–60 – 1st). In 1956 Metalul Hunedoara was renamed as Energia Hunedoara, but in 1958 the named was changed again, this time in Corvinul Hunedoara. The football club based in Hunedoara frequently changed its name between 1921 and 1958 in order to create a personalized identity, something more special, that will remain in people's minds and be directly associated with Hunedoara. Even if the name Corvinul did not catch on immediately, the later performances and its uniqueness in the Romanian football landscape stuck it to the football club based in Hunedoara.

Corvinul promoted to Divizia A in the summer of 1960, and it seemed that a new era was starting "under the blast furnaces", but again, the team relegated after only one season in the top-flight after it was ranked the last, out of 14 teams. The situation began to become dramatic after another year, when Corvinul made one of its worst seasons and was ranked the last in the Divizia B, relegating down to the third tier, for the first time in the last decade. After the relegation, the local authorities decided to change again the name, because Corvinul was an unlucky choice and renamed the club as Siderurgistul Hunedoara, again financially supported by the Iron Plant. Iron Plant of Hunedoara was not as big as Galați steel works, so automatically had less financial strength. As a result, Siderurgistul (again Metalul Hunedoara since 1964) played for no less than five consecutive seasons in the Divizia C. Finally, "the Steelworkers" promoted back in 1967, when they were ranked 1st, four points in front of another "factory team", Tractorul Brașov.

From the middle 1960s to the middle 1970s, Metalul Hunedoara, then renamed again as Corvinul Hunedoara (in 1970) settled as an important Divizia B side, ranking between 4th and 13th place, but never with really important chances of promotion.

Golden Age of Corvinul (1975–1990)

At the end of the 1975–76, Corvinul promoted back to Divizia A, after 15 years of absence and struggles. It was the very beginning of Hunedoara ascension in the Romanian football. In the first half of the season, the team was managed by Ladislau Vlad and Constantin Toma, then in the second half by Ilie Savu, Victor Cojocaru and Remus Vlad. The squad was composed of the following players: Gheorghe Bologan, Romulus Cocu and Emeric Moritz – Ioan Stan, Nicolae Jurcă, Remus Vlad, Vasile Ghiță, Dorin Nicșa, Ioan Petcu, Alexe Lazăr, Marian Deacu, Octavian Cojocaru, Virgil Stoica, Ilie Ologu, Clemen Șureghin, Eremia Șumulanschi, Ioan Bucur, Ioan Năstase, Petre Șchiopu, Gheorghe Albu, Vasile Dina, Gheorghe Georgescu, Florea Văetuș and Dan Pintilie.

In 1975 the football section was separated from the Corvinul Sports Club and the team was renamed as FC Corvinul. It was the third football club in Romania that adopted the "FC" abbreviation in its name, after FC Argeș Pitești and FC Bihor Oradea. During the 1970s, Hunedoara's people passion for football grew up at the same time with the city's development. The Steel Plant was a force in the national industry. Starting with the spring of 1976, young footballers of the club such as Dorin Nicșa, Ioan Petcu, Florea Văetuș, Gheorghe Albu or Mihai Viespe begin to be summoned to the national groups of juniors and youth. A natural fact, especially since, at the end of the 1976–77 season, Corvinul Reserves Squad was ranked on an honorable 3rd place in the championship.

In the same year 1976, Gelu Simoc (one of the 28 founding members of FC Corvinul Hunedoara, at that time head of the Personal Service within the Hunedoara Steel Plant) managed to convince Radu Nunweiller (a star of the Romanian football at that moment) to come to Hunedoara, thinking that, if, for years in a row, the Romania national football team was built, practically around him, the same could have happened in Hunedoara. However, the experience of the Dinamo player would have been extremely useful for the team in its third appearance in the First Division. A year later, also at the end of his career, Mircea Lucescu was also persuaded to come to Hunedoara. The director of the Steel Plant at the time, Sabin Faur, led the final negotiations. However, the main merit for Lucescu's arrival in Hunedoara had the same man, Gelu Simoc. After a 14th place (1976–77) and an 8th place (1977–78), Corvinul relegated back to the second tier, at the end of the 1978–79 season. After the match in which "the Steelworkers" lost any chance of remaining in the top-flight, Mircea Lucescu had one of the most pleasant "shocks" of his life when he was taken out from the stadium on arms and led in cheers and encouragement to his home by the fans, like a hero, although the team had just relegated.

That moment remained in Hunedoara's history as the moment when a memorable team was born. Even if Corvinul relegated, the club's youth teams performed at a high level, then Mircea Lucescu assumed the role of manager and convinced Florea Dumitrache, another legend of the Romania national football team of the 1970s, to sign with Corvinul. In the following years, the "square" formed of Radu Nunweiller – Florea Dumitrache – Remus Vlad – Mircea Lucescu served as a support for the extraordinary rise of young footballers, among them: Michael Klein, Romulus Gabor, Ioan Andone, Mircea Rednic and others. Corvinul promoted back to Divizia A after only one season in the second league, winning its series. At the end of the 1980–81 season, Corvinul was ranked 6th, then in the following season "the Ravens" achieved their best performance, a 3rd place. During that season, the team based in Hunedoara was also the leader of the league for a period and in the first squad 9 players were born in Hunedoara County. The squad was managed by Mircea Lucescu (player and manager) and was formed by following players: Niculai Alexa, Marian Ioniță – Ioan Andone, Mircea Rednic, Ioan Bogdan, Dumitru Gălan, Florin Dubinciuc, Michael Klein, Constantin Dumitriu, Victor Oncu, Dorin Nicșa, Dorin Mateuț, Ioan Petcu, Romulus Gabor, Florea Văetuș, Florea Dumitrache and Mircea Lucescu.

As a result of this performance, FC Corvinul qualified for the 1982–83 UEFA Cup season. "The White and Blues" beat Austrian side Grazer AK (3–1 on aggregate) in the First Round, but in the second round lost to Yugoslavian side FK Sarajevo (4–8 on aggregate). During the 1980s, Corvinul became a force in the Romanian football, a name to be feared, but also to be highly respected. "Hunedorenii" were well known as a very good and offensive team on their home ground, where over this decade obtain some shocking results, among them: 9–0 vs. Rapid București, 8–0 vs. Politehnica Iași or 3–1 vs. Steaua București, this last one was obtained weeks before Steaua achieved its best performance, winning the 1986 European Cup Final, against FC Barcelona. During "Jackie" Ionescu tenure as manager of the team (1984–1986), was born a phrase that stuck with Corvinul over time, "norma hunedoareană" (Hunedoara's standard), phrase that appear from Corvinul's offensive style of football, "the Ravens" scoring in general at least three goals on their home ground. As good as it was on its home ground, Corvinul was in generally a mediocre team on away ground, when also registered its biggest defeat, 0–11 vs. Steaua București, in 1988.

In 1988 the flame began to go out, even though the reputed manager and teacher Constantin "Titi" Ardeleanu tried a refreshment of the squad. Ardeleanu's words from that time, remained deeply inscribed in the history wall of the club: "Corvinul is an important name in the Romanian football. Its contribution to the latest great international successes is undeniable! Present in many national teams, the footballers of Hunedoara gave the exact measure of their value, and Corvinul is one of the first teams in the country!" Between 1982 and 1990, the team based in Hunedoara obtained the following rankings: 1982–83 – 6th, 1983–84 – 12th, 1984–85 – 8th, 1985–86 – 5th, 1986–87 – 9th, 1987–88 – 7th, 1988–89 – 15th and 1989–90 – 8th.

The Fall of a Legendary Club  (1990–2004)

The 1990s represent the fall of communism in Romania and the start of a new beginning for the country, but for the iron and mining industries, two of the engines of the 1970s and 1980s economy was the beginning of the end. Hunedoara County was one of the most affected regions due to its economy, which was based exactly on this two sectors of activity. The downfall of the economy affected directly the two most important clubs of the county Corvinul and Jiul Petroșani. If Jiul continued to struggle between the top two leagues for the next approximately  15 years, Corvinul played in the top-flight for only two more seasons: 1990–91 and 1991–92, but with result below expectations, ranking 14th and 18th, this latest result meant automatically the relegation to Divizia B, for the first time in the latest 12 years.

Back in the second division, "the Ravens" accused the shock of relegation and obtained two weak rankings, in the middle and second half of the table, then the 1994–95 season it seemed to be their chance to save and relaunch the club. "The White and Blues" finished the championship as runners-up in their series and qualified for the promotion play-off, where they lost 0–1 against Sportul Studențesc București. In the same period, the productive Youth Center of Corvinul gave to the Romanian football a new important name, Bogdan Lobonț, who will be sold to Rapid București, two years later. Back in the second division, Corvinul results were modest and the financial support of the Iron Plant less and less consistent, thus between 1996 and 1999, the team settled in the middle of the table, between 7th and 10th place.

Apart from its financial and sportive situation, Youth Center of Corvinul continue to "produce" important players, among them Bogdan Andone, Decebal Gheară or Bogdan Apostu, thus, with a new generation and some financial support from the Municipality of Hunedoara, Corvinul fight for a new promotion, but end the 1999–2000 season only on the 3rd place, behind Gaz Metan Mediaș and ARO Câmpulung. This was the last season in which the team based in Hunedoara fought for promotion to the top-flight. Next season, "the Ravens" relegated to Divizia C, for the first time in the last 34 years, but promoted back after one season. For the next four seasons, Corvinul played in the second division, but at its best was ranked 7th, finally in the autumn of 2004 the club was excluded from all competitions by the Romanian Football Federation because of the debts accumulated over the years.

Successors and processes (2005–2021)

Between 2004 and 2016 the club had no senior squads registered to play in any Romanian Football Federation competition, and was kept alive only by one youth squad that played in the County Championship. In 2016, Hunedoara Court decided that FC Corvinul will be dissolved for a debt of approx. 160,500$, even though the club has managed to postpone this sentence since 2008, in the light of a lawsuit won against Rapid București regarding Bogdan Lobonț transfer to Ajax. Corvinul should have collected the amount of 900,000$, but Rapid also entered in bankruptcy, so Hunedoara Court considered that Corvinul has no way to collect the money and must enter in liquidation.

In 2005, the last president of FC Corvinul, Mircea Alic, registered Corvinul's brand and subsequently sold it to Octavian Marian, a businessman from Bucharest, for approx. 45,000€. In the same year, Municipality of Hunedoara founded SC Corvinul 2005 Hunedoara, the club bought its place in the second division from CS Deva, but it had a short life, the financial problems appeared again and in 2008, the new club was also dissolved. In the summer of 2009 a new successor club was founded, FC Hunedoara, a club which played many consecutive seasons in the Liga III and for four years in a row missed promotion to Liga II by a slight margin. In the summer of 2016, this entity was excluded as well from Liga III due to financial problems. Relegated in the County League, FC Hunedoara was re-organized as CS Hunedoara and promoted back.

Between 2005 and 2021, no one of the successor clubs could use FC Corvinul brand, despite the fact that the original club was a dormant one, until 2016 when Hunedoara Court decided that FC Corvinul must enter in liquidation, officially. The main issue was that Mircea Alic registered the brand, then sold it to Octavian Marian, who had no interest in handing it over to the Municipality of Hunedoara. Corvinul 2005, FC Hunedoara and CS Hunedoara were the successor of FC Corvinul, from a sportive point of view. These entities used the white and blue colors, Michael Klein Stadium as a home ground and were also supported by Corvinul's fans and ultras groups.

Corvinul is back (2021–present)
In the summer of 2021, on the occasion of Corvinul's Centenary, the original brand, "FC Corvinul 1921" was bought for 47,000€ from Octavian Marian. For the brand acquisition, legendary names of the club were involved, among them Ioan Andone, Mircea Lucescu, Bogdan Apostu or Mircea Rednic, also with the support of Municipality of Hunedoara. Corvinul's Ultras groups collected more than 12,000€ and also contributed as volunteers in the campaign for Corvinul's brand acquisition. Now, it is expected that in the summer of 2022, CS Hunedoara will be merged with FC Corvinul, in order to bring back to life the old club, but also to give legal continuity for the last 17 years of struggles. CS Hunedoara already uses Corvinul logo on his shirts and marketing campaigns, as well as the official website.

In the summer of 2022, CS Hunedoara was officially renamed as CS Corvinul 1921 Hunedoara (due to merge between CS Hunedoara and Corvinul Hunedoara brand). As a result, CS Hunedoara became the official successor of FC Corvinul.

Grounds

In its first years of existence, Fero Sport Hunedoara played its home matches on the Poarta Zgurii Stadium, a ground with a capacity of only 400–500 people, two locker rooms, a warehouse and a few small annexes. Enough for a town that, at the time, had only about 4,000 inhabitants. During the World War II, the stadium was occupied by the Soviet Army, thus the football team moved its home matches on Hășdat Stadium, considered for many organizational reasons to be inappropriate. The locker rooms were in some annexes near the Corvin Castle, and the footballers were transported to the Hășdat Stadium by carts or trucks.

During the 1950s, the Iron Plant was already transformed into a real Steel Plant and a new city was "raising" in the eastern zone of the old town. The new city needed a new sports base, a stage built mainly for the football team, the old stadium, known during this period as Metalul Stadium or Energia Stadium was considered obsolete.

On 2 May 1960, Corvinul Sports Complex was opened with a football match between Corvinul and CFR Arad, won by the hosts with 1–0. The new stadium had a capacity of 16,000 people. In the mid-1990s, the stadium was renamed as Michael Klein Stadium, in the honour of Michael Klein, former footballer of "the Ravens" and Romanian internation, who died tragically at only 33 years-old, during a training of his team from that moment, Bayer Uerdingen. In 2006 the stadium was renovated and 3,000 seats were mounted.

Honours

Liga I:
Best finish: 3rd 1981–82
Liga II:
Winners (4): 1953, 1959–60, 1975–76, 1979–80
Runners-up (3): 1956, 1957–58, 1994–95
Liga III:
Winners (3): 1966–67, 2001–02, 2021–22
Runners-up (3): 1965–66, 2011–12, 2012–13
Liga IV – Hunedoara County
Winners (2): 2009–10, 2017–18

FC Corvinul Hunedoara in Europe

Overall Record

Matches

Players

First team squad

Out on loan

Club Officials

Board of directors

Current technical staff

Chronology of names

League history

Notable former players
The footballers enlisted below have had international cap(s) for their respective countries at junior and/or senior level and/or more than 100 caps for Corvinul Hunedoara.

  Ioan Andone
  Ioan Bogdan
  Alexandru Crețu
  Florea Dumitrache
  Constantin Dumitriu
  Romulus Gabor
  Decebal Gheară
  Ovidiu Hanganu
  Michael Klein
  Bogdan Lobonț
  Mircea Lucescu
  Ioan Mărginean
  Dorin Mateuț
  Radu Nunweiller
  Marius Păcurar
  Ioan Petcu
  Mircea Rednic
  Florea Văetuș
  Remus Vlad

Notable managers

  Mircea Lucescu
  Ion Nunweiller
  Dumitru Pătrașcu
  Mircea Pătrașcu
  Ioan Petcu
  Florea Văetuș
  Ladislau Vlad

References

External links

Football clubs in Hunedoara County
Association football clubs established in 1921
Liga I clubs
Liga II clubs
Liga III clubs
Liga IV clubs
1921 establishments in Romania